The 2004 Cork Senior Football Championship was the 116th staging of the Cork Senior Football Championship since its establishment by the Cork County Board in 1887. The draw for the opening fixtures took place on 14 December 2003. The championship began on 7 April 2004 and ended on 17 October 2004.

Castlehaven entered the championship as the defending champions, however, they were beaten by Mallow in round 4.

On 17 October 2004, Carbery won the championship following a 1-11 to 0-07 defeat of Bishopstown in the final. This was their fourth championship title overall and their first title since 1971.

Fionán Murray from the St. Finbarr's club was the championship's top scorer with 1-30.

Team changes

To Championship

Promoted from the Cork Intermediate Football Championship
 Ilen Rovers

Results

Round 1

Round 2

Castlehaven received a bye in this round.

Divisional section

Round 3

Round 4

Quarter-finals

Semi-finals

Final

Championship statistics

Top scorers

Overall

In a single game

Miscellaneous

Carbery win their first time since 1971.
Carbery are the first divisional team since Duhallow in 1991.

References

Cork Senior Football Championship
Cork Senior Football Championship